Lesley Pearse (born 24 February 1945) is a British novelist, with global sales of over 10 million copies. She started writing at the age of 35, but was not published until she was 48.

Pearse lives in Devon, England. She has three daughters and three grandchildren. Her second husband was in a rock band during the 1960s.

Novels
Georgia	(1993)
Tara	(1994)
Charity (1995)
Ellie	(1996)
Camellia	(1997)
Rosie	(1998)	
Charlie	(1999)	
Never Look Back	(2000)	
Trust Me	(2001)	
Father Unknown	(2002)	
Till We Meet Again	(2002)	
Remember Me	(2003)	
Secrets	(2004)	
A Lesser Evil	(2005)	
Hope	(2006)	
Faith	(2007)	
Gypsy	(2008)	
Stolen	(2010)	
Belle	(2011)
The Promise	(2012)
Forgive Me	(2013)	
Survivor	(2014)	
Without a Trace	(2015)	
Dead to Me	(2016)
The Woman in the Wood (2017)
The House Across the Street (2018)
You'll Never See Me Again (2019)
Liar  (2020)
 Suspects (2021)

References

1945 births
Living people
British women novelists
British romantic fiction writers
Women romantic fiction writers
20th-century British novelists
20th-century British women writers
21st-century British novelists
21st-century British women writers